Arnar Stadium is an all-seater stadium in Ijevan, Armenia, mainly used for football matches. With a capacity of 2,100 seats, it is the only stadium in Ijevan.

Overview
The stadium was built in 2007, by the "Arnar" Charitable Fund directed by the Armenian businessman Artsruni Ghalumian. The first ever competitive match in Arnar Stadium was the Armenian Independence Cup final match in 2008 between Ararat Yerevan and Banants. Ararat Yerevan won the title defeating Banmants 2-1 after extra time with the presence of 2,500 spectators.

Between 2011 and 2012, the stadium was used as a home venue by two teams of the Armenian Premier League; Impulse from Dilijan and Shirak from Gyumri.

The stadium has an adjacent small pitch designated for trainings.

References

External links
Arnar stadium photos

Football venues in Armenia
Buildings and structures in Tavush Province
2007 establishments in Armenia
Sports venues completed in 2007